The 46th Texas Legislature met from January 10, 1939, to June 21, 1939. All members present during this session were elected in the 1938 general elections.

Sessions

Regular Session: January 10, 1939 – June 21, 1939

Party summary

Senate

House

Officers

Senate
 Lieutenant Governor: Coke R. Stevenson (D)
 President Pro Tempore: Weaver Moore (D)

House
 Speaker of the House: Robert Emmett Morse (D)

Members

Senate

Dist. 1
 E. Harold Beck (D), Texarkana

Dist. 2
 Joe Hill (D), Henderson

Dist. 3
 John S. Redditt (D), Lufkin

Dist. 4
 Allan Shivers (D), Port Arthur

Dist. 5
 Gordon Burns (D), Huntsville

Dist. 6
 Clay Cotten (D), Palestine

Dist. 7
 Will D. Pace (D), Tyler

Dist. 8
 A. M. Aiken, Jr. (D), Paris

Dist. 9
 Olin Van Zandt (D), Tioga

Dist. 10
 Claude Isbell (D), Rockwall

Dist. 11
 William Graves (D), Dallas

Dist. 12
 Vernon Lemmons (D), Waxahachie

Dist. 13
 Doss Hardin (D), Waco

Dist. 14
 Albert Stone (D), Brenham

Dist. 15
 Louis Sulak (D), La Grange

Dist. 16
 Weaver Moore (D), Houston

Dist. 17
 William Stone (D), Galveston

Dist. 18
 Morris Roberts (D), Pettus

Dist. 19
 Rudolph A. Weinert (D), Seguin

Dist. 20
 Houghton Brownlee (D), Austin

Dist. 21
 James Manley Head (D), Stephenville

Dist. 22
 Royston Lanning (D), Jacksboro

Dist. 23
 George Moffett (D), Chillicothe

Dist. 24
 Wilbourne Collie (D), Eastland

Dist. 25
 Penrose Metcalfe (D), San Angelo

Dist. 26
 J. Franklin Spears (D), San Antonio

Dist. 27
 Rogers Kelly (D), Edinburg

Dist. 28
 Jesse Martin (D), Fort Worth

Dist. 29
 Henry L. Winfield (D), Fort Stockton

Dist. 30
 G. Hobert Nelson (D), Lubbock

Dist. 31
 C.C. Small (D), Amarillo

House
The House was composed of 150 Democrats.

House members included future Governor Price Daniel and future U.S. Representative Homer Thornberry.

Sources
Legislative Reference Library of Texas

External links

46th Texas Legislature
1939 in Texas
1939 U.S. legislative sessions